Peter II (8 July 1827 – 13 June 1900) was the reigning Grand Duke of Oldenburg from 1853 to 1900. He claimed hereditary parts of Duchy of Holstein after the Second Schleswig War in 1864. After signing a treaty on 23 February 1867 in Kiel, he renounced his claims. In return, he received the district of Ahrensbök, the Prussian parts of the former Principality of Lübeck other than the village of Travenhorst, and was given a million taler as compensation from Prussia. Thus the Grand Duchy of Oldenburg gained access to the Baltic Sea.

Birth and family
Duke Nikolaus Friedrich Peter was the only son of Augustus, Grand Duke of Oldenburg by his second wife Princess Ida of Anhalt-Bernburg-Schaumburg-Hoym. He was born on 8 July 1827 in Oldenburg.

Early life
In his youth, he served as a General of Cavalry in the Prussian army. He also served as General of Infantry in the Hanoverian army.

Marriage
On 10 February 1852, Peter married Princess Elisabeth of Saxe-Altenburg. She was the fourth daughter of Joseph, Duke of Saxe-Altenburg and Amelia of Württemberg, and was a sister of Queen Marie of Hanover and Grand Duchess Alexandra Iosifovna of Russia.

They had two sons, Frederick Augustus (born in 1852) and George (born in 1855). Peter II may have had an illegitimate son, Peter Altmann (Rastede 1857-Brighton 1934), married and had issue.

Reign
He succeeded his father as Grand Duke in 1853. Peter ruled over a population of roughly 800,000.

Peter's family had ties to the Russian imperial family (both were descendants of Christian Albrecht of Holstein-Gottorp), so that he sided with Russia against Austria during the Crimean War. During the First Schleswig-Holstein War, he laid claim to part of the territories seized by Prussia, but in 1866 ceded his claim to the duchies. The following year, he created a military compact with Prussia, in which his troops were incorporated into the corps of Prince Frederick Charles of Prussia during the Franco-Prussian War.

In 1896, his wife Elisabeth died. She died a year after their daughter-in-law Elisabeth Anna.

After he suffered from heart trouble resulting from overwork, Peter's physicians recommended he have a long trip abroad. He died the following year, on 13 June 1900 at his summer residence in Rastede. He was succeeded as Grand Duke by his eldest son, Frederick Augustus.

Honours

Ancestry and descent

Ancestry

Issue

References

1827 births
1900 deaths
People from Oldenburg (city)
Grand Dukes of Oldenburg
Burials at the Ducal Mausoleum, Gertrudenfriedhof (Oldenburg)
Generals of Cavalry (Prussia)
Grand Crosses of the Order of Saint Stephen of Hungary
19th-century art collectors
German art collectors
German Lutherans